Yoshihito  is a masculine Japanese given name.

Possible writings
Yoshihito can be written using different combinations of kanji characters. Here are some examples:

義人, "justice, person"
義仁, "justice, benevolence"
吉人, "good luck, person"
吉仁, "good luck, benevolence"
善人, "virtuous, person"
善仁, "virtuous, benevolence"
芳人, "virtuous/fragrant, person"
芳仁, "virtuous/fragrant, benevolence"
良人, "good, person"
良仁, "good, benevolence"
喜仁, "rejoice, benevolence"
慶仁, "congratulate, benevolence"
佳仁, "skilled, benevolence"

The name can also be written in hiragana よしひと or katakana ヨシヒト.

Notable people with the name
 Emperor Taishō, previously known as Prince Yoshihito (嘉仁, 1879–1926)
 Yoshihito, Prince Katsura (宜仁, 1948–2014), previously known as Prince Yoshihito of Mikasa, grandson of Emperor Taishō
Yoshihito Onda (恩田 快人, born 1963), bassist and founder of the 1990s pop band Judy and Mary
, Japanese footballer
, Japanese footballer
, Japanese baseball infielder
, Japanese tennis player
, Japanese football player
, Japanese rugby union player

Japanese masculine given names